is a subregion of the Kyushu region of Japan. This southern region encompasses the prefectures of Kagoshima, Miyazaki, and Okinawa.

It has more of a subtropical climate than the rest of Kyushu.

See also
 Northern Kyushu
 List of regions of Japan
 Prefectures of Japan
 Ryukyu Islands

Notes

External links
 Kyushu Tourism Information,  Southern Kyushu maps

Kyushu region